Toronto riot may refer to:
 1855 Toronto Circus Riot
 1875 Jubilee riots
 1918 Toronto anti-Greek riot
 1933 Christie Pits riot
 1981 Operation Soap
 1992 Yonge Street riot
 2010 G20 Toronto summit protests
 Riot Fest, a music festival held in Toronto, 2013–2015